Tonkhil is a sum (district) of Govi-Altai Province in western Mongolia. In 2009, its population was 2,402.

References 

Populated places in Mongolia
Districts of Govi-Altai Province